Matthew Day Jackson (born 1974) is an American artist whose multifaceted practice encompasses sculpture, painting, collage, photography, drawing, video, performance and installation. Since graduating with an MFA from Rutgers University in 2001, following his BFA from the University of Washington in Seattle, he has had numerous solo exhibitions. His work has been shown at MAMbo Museo d'Arte Moderna in Bologna, Italy; Boulder Museum of Contemporary Art in Boulder, Colorado; the Museum of Fine Arts in Boston, MA; the Portland Museum of Art Biennial in Portland, Maine; and the Whitney Biennial Day for Night in New York.

Work
Jackson's works utilize a familiar iconography - images such as the geodesic structures of Buckminster Fuller, mankind's first steps on the moon, and the covers of Life magazine from the 1960s and 1970s - and references from art history. Materials he employs have included scorched wood, molten lead, mother-of-pearl, precious metals, formica, and found objects such as worn T-shirts, prosthetic limbs, axe handles and posters.

The critic Jeffrey Kastner has noted that his works locate ‘startling beauty in their counterintuitive material juxtapositions.’ However, for Jackson beauty is frequently partnered by desolation. His work explores a concept that he terms ‘the Horriful’, the belief that everything one does has the potential to bring both beauty and horror. In one such work, titled Little Bouquet in Clay Jar (2018), the artist incorporates an aerial view of the Trinity test site, explaining that 'the job of the apocalypse or the reckoning is the job of a god or deity, but in the 20th century, it became a human possibility.'

Matthew Day Jackson is represented by Hauser & Wirth and Grimm Gallery in Amsterdam.

Selected solo exhibitions

2013

"Something Ancient, Something New, Something Stolen, Something Blue", Hauser & Wirth 18th Street, New York NY

"Total Accomplishment", ZKM Museum of Contemporary Art, Karlsruhe, Germany

2012

"In Search Of..." Gemeentemuseum, The Hague, Netherlands

2011

"Heel gezellig," Grimm Gallery, Amsterdam, The Netherlands

"Everything Leads to Another," Hauser & Wirth, London, England

"In Search Of..." MAMbo, Bologna, Italy

"In Search Of..." Kunstmuseum Luzern, Lucerne, Switzerland

2009

"Dynamic Maximum Tension," Grimm Gallery, Amsterdam

"The Immeasurable Distance," MIT List Visual Art Center, Cambridge MA

2007

"Paradise Now! (The Salvage) Workspace Matthew Day Jackson," The Blanton Museum of Art, Austin TX

2006

"Paradise Now!" Portland Institute of Contemporary Art, Portland OR

2004

"By No Means Necessary," The Locker Plant, Chinati Foundation, Marfa TX

Selected group exhibitions

2012

"Hauser & Wirth, “Science on the back end": Artists selected by Matthew Day Jackson, New York NY

"Saatchi Gallery, ‘Out of focus: Photography", London, England

"Public Art Fund, ‘Common Ground", New York NY

2011

"Autobody: Featuring North of South West of East," Ballroom Marfa, Marfa TX

"Singular Visions," Whitney Museum of American Art, New York NY

"The World Belongs to You," Palazzo Grassi, Francois Pinault Foundation, Venice, Italy

"The Shape We're In," Zabludowicz Collection, London, England

"American Exuberance," Rubell Family Collection/Contemporary Arts Foundation, Miami FL

2010

"New Paintings," Grimm Gallery, The Netherlands

"Born in Dystopia," Rosenblum Collection, Paris, France

2009

"Hi, Low and in Between," Grimm Gallery, Amsterdam, The Netherlands

"The World is Yours," Louisiana Museum of Contemporary Art, Humlebaek, Denmark

"Deceitful Moon," Hayward Gallery Project Space, London, England

"Mapping the Studio: Artists from the Francois Pinault Collection," Venice, Italy

2008

"Heartland," Van Abbemuseum, Eindoven, The Netherlands

2006

"USA Today," Royal Academy of Art, London, England

"Uncertain States of America - American Art in the Third Millenium" Serpentine Gallery, London (Travelling Exhibition)

2005

"The Greater New York," PS1 Contemporary Art Center, New York NY

2003

"Biennial," Portland Museum of Art, Portland OR

External links
Matthew Day Jackson at Hauser & Wirth

Ten "Greater New York" Artists Most Likely to Succeed (As featured in)
The Saatchi Gallery; About Matthew Day Jackson and his art Additional information on Matthew Day Jackson including artworks, text panels, articles, and full biography
Brooklyn Rail In Conversation Matthew Day Jackson with Charles Schultz
Bucky (ROYGBV), Proof I/V from Dymaxion Series Print at Museum of Fine Arts, Boston

1974 births
Living people
20th-century American painters
American male painters
21st-century American painters
21st-century American male artists
American contemporary painters
20th-century American male artists